Mackenzie Margaret Carol Padington (born 2 March 1999) is a Canadian swimmer. She competed in the women's 400 metre freestyle event at the 2017 World Aquatics Championships. In 2019, she represented Canada at the 2019 World Aquatics Championships held in Gwangju, South Korea. She competed in the women's 400 metre freestyle and women's 800 metre freestyle events. In both events she did not advance to compete in the final.

References

External links
 

1999 births
Living people
Canadian female freestyle swimmers
Place of birth missing (living people)